Dieter Jung (born 10 October 1940) is a German former fencer. He competed at the 1968 and 1972 Summer Olympics.

References

External links
 

1940 births
Living people
German male fencers
Olympic fencers of West Germany
Fencers at the 1968 Summer Olympics
Fencers at the 1972 Summer Olympics
Sportspeople from Würzburg
20th-century German people